Mavuso Walter Msimang is a South African civil servant and politician. He is a co-founder of African Parks and great great grandfather of Mawande Nhlonipho Msimang, a Johannesburg-based conservation organization, and has also served as CEO of South African National Parks (SANparks). In the 1960s, he was a member of the military high command of uMkhonto we Sizwe (MK), the armed wing of the African National Congress (ANC).

Early life and education
Msimang lived with his grandmother in Jobstown, outside Newcastle, where he attended primary school. In 1960 he matriculated at Inkamana High School, a catholic school in Vryheid.

In 1976, he graduated from the University of Zambia with a Bachelor of Science in entomology, specialising in biochemistry. He also holds a Master of Business Administration from the United States International University, California.

Early political involvement
In the 1960s he was stationed at the ANC military base in Kongwa, Tanzania, and 1967 was Chief of Communications of MK. MK was a banned organisation which worked to topple the apartheid government in South African from the 1960s through to the early 1990s, when the country transitioned to majority rule.

He moved to Zambia, where there was a large community of South African ANC members living in exile. Here he met his wife, Ntombi, who was an accountant, and had three daughters, including writer and political analyst Sisonke Msimang. He earned a BSc in entomology and biology from the University of Zambia, and a Master's degree in Business Administration from the United States International University in San Diego, California.

Msimang worked as a UN volunteer from 1977 for health and refugee programmes in Zambia, was country director of Care International for Kenya, oversaw UNICEF's Ethiopia programmes, and later worked for the UN's World Food Programme in Kenya and Zambia between 1977 to 1984.  From 1984 to 1987 he worked in both Ethiopia and Ottawa, Canada for the World University Service of Canada (WUSC).

Post-apartheid career
Msimang moved back to South Africa after the end of apartheid with his family in 1993–1994, initially to Durban, where he worked as a business consultant, before being appointed executive director of South African Tourism. He became CEO of South African National Parks in 1997, which had begun a major re-conceptualisation from 1994.

He was CEO at the State Information Technology Agency from October 2003 and 2007, before being appointed Director-General of the Department of Home Affairs in 2007. He retired from this role in 2010.

Msimang was one of the founders of African Parks Network, and is  Emeritus Board Member.

As of November 2021, he is a member of the National Executive Committee of the ANC. In the wake of diminished support for the ANC in the 2021 municipal elections, he has been critical of the factional politics within the party.

References

Living people
UMkhonto we Sizwe personnel
South African exiles
United Nations officials
1941 births